Clyde Stalcup "Bud" Bloomfield (January 5, 1936 – December 21, 2011) was an American professional baseball player. A backup infielder, he had an eight-year career in minor league baseball, interrupted by brief Major League appearances for the  St. Louis Cardinals (one game) and  Minnesota Twins (seven games).

Born in Oklahoma City, Oklahoma, Bloomfield attended the University of Tulsa and the University of Arkansas before signing with the Cardinals. He spent three minor league seasons (1961–63) in his native Oklahoma as a member of the Double-A Tulsa Oilers.  In Bloomfield's Major League debut — and his only Cardinal appearance — he was a defensive replacement for star Cardinal third baseman Ken Boyer in a 5–2 victory over the Chicago Cubs at Wrigley Field. Bloomfield was in the on-deck circle when the Redbirds made their final out of the game, and did not record a plate appearance.

Drafted by the Twins during the off-season, Bloomfield spent most of the 1964 season with the Triple-A Atlanta Crackers. He started two games for the Twins as a second baseman on May 7–8.  In the former, he collected his only MLB hit, a single off Fred Newman of the Los Angeles Angels.  Bloomfield retired after the 1964 season.

Bloomfield died in 2011 in Huntsville, Arkansas, at the age of 75.

References

External links
Career record and playing statistics from Baseball Reference

1936 births
2011 deaths
Arkansas Razorbacks baseball players
Atlanta Crackers players
Baseball players from Oklahoma
Decatur Commodores players
Keokuk Cardinals players
Major League Baseball infielders
Minnesota Twins players
People from Huntsville, Arkansas
St. Louis Cardinals players
Sportspeople from Oklahoma City
Tulsa Oilers (baseball) players
Winston-Salem Red Birds players